Moutier-d’Ahun (literally Moutier of Ahun) is a commune in the Creuse department in the Nouvelle-Aquitaine region in central France.

Geography
The river Creuse flows through the middle of the village.

Population

Sights
 The church, once part of a monastery, dating from the fourteenth century.
 A medieval stone bridge.

See also
Communes of the Creuse department

References

Communes of Creuse